Carlo Giorgio Domenico Enrico Catani (22 April 1852 – 20 July 1918) was a civil engineer who worked in Australia for the Victorian Government for the majority of his career.

He oversaw many projects, including:
the draining of the Koo-Wee-Rup swamp
widening and improvement of the Yarra River upstream from Princes Bridge, Alexandra Avenue and the laying out and planting of the Alexandra Gardens
roads to Arthurs Seat and to Mount Donna Buang
the Elwood Canal
Murray River levees (Strathmerton district)
Lake Catani on Mount Buffalo
reclamation and the layout of the St Kilda foreshore.

The township of Catani, Victoria, Lake Catani at Mt Buffalo and Catani Gardens in St. Kilda, are named after him.

References

1852 births
1918 deaths
Engineers from Melbourne
Australian civil engineers
Engineers from Florence
Italian civil engineers
Italian expatriates in Australia